Superliga may refer to:

Sports
Superliga can refer to different sports leagues:

Association football
Albanian Superliga, the Albanian top-flight men's division
Danish Superliga, the Danish top-flight men's division
Liga Super Indonesia, Indonesian top-flight division
Football Superleague of Kosovo, the Kosovar top-flight men's division
Malaysia Super League, the Malaysian top-flight men's division
Argentine Superliga, the Argentine top-flight men's division
North American SuperLiga, a tournament among top North American clubs
Primeira Liga, the current name for Portuguese SuperLiga, the Portuguese top-flight men's division
Romanian Superliga (women's football), the Romanian top level league for women
Serbian Superliga, the Serbian top-flight men's division
Slovak Superliga, the Slovak top-flight men's division
Superliga Colombiana, Colombian official tournament between Apertura and Finalización champions
Superliga Femenina, the Spanish top-flight women's division
Süper Lig, the Turkish top-flight men's division
Super Liga Timorense, the East Timor top-flight division

Volleyball
Superliga Brasileira de Voleibol, Brazilian men's and women's top-flight volleyball division
Superliga de Voleibol Masculina, the Spanish men's volleyball top league
Superliga Femenina de Voleibol, the Spanish women's volleyball top league
Philippine Super Liga, Filipino men's and women's volleyball league

Other sports
Polish Superliga, Polish men's top-flight handball league
Romanian Superliga, the Romanian top-flight men's water polo division
Russian Hockey Super League, Russian top-flight ice hockey division
Swedish Super League, Swedish men's top floorball league
Swedish Super League, Swedish women's top floorball league
Ukraine Rugby Superliga, Ukrainian top-flight men's rugby division
SuperLiga (rugby), Romanian top-flight men's rugby division

Other uses
"Superliga" (song), by Danish rock band Nephew

See also

Liga (disambiguation)
Super League (disambiguation)